Esteban José Jean-Pierre Ocon-Khelfane (born 17 September 1996) is a French racing driver currently racing for the BWT Alpine Formula 1 Team in Formula One. 

Ocon experienced a successful junior career as he won the 2014 FIA Formula 3 European Championship and the 2015 GP3 Series despite only winning one race in the latter campaign, which earned him a place at the Mercedes driver development programme, for whom he worked as a reserve driver. After winning the GP3 title, Ocon made his Formula One debut for Manor Racing in the 2016 Belgian Grand Prix, replacing Rio Haryanto. He moved to Force India/Racing Point in 2017, partnering Mexican driver Sergio Pérez for the 2017 and 2018 Formula 1 seasons. Ocon was sacked by Racing Point at the end of the 2018 season and thus became a reserve driver for Mercedes in 2019 until his move to Renault for 2020. He took his maiden Formula One podium at the 2020 Sakhir Grand Prix and maiden victory at the 2021 Hungarian Grand Prix. 

Despite not winning a single race in 2022, he secured his best position in the drivers' standings in eighth with 92 points, 11 points clear of teammate Fernando Alonso, helping to secure fourth in the Constructors' Championship for Alpine.

Early and personal life 
Esteban Ocon was born in Évreux, Normandy to Sabrine Khelfane and Laurent Ocon, a mechanic who owns a garage in Évreux. His paternal family is originally from Málaga. While competing in karting, his parents had to sell their family home, which included his father's garage, to fund his karting career. After selling the house, they lived and travelled to races in a caravan Ocon also used as a motor home.
, Ocon lives in Geneva, Switzerland. Besides his native French language, Ocon also speaks in English, Spanish and Italian.

Early career

2006–2011: Karting
Ocon entered karting in 2006, when he finished eighth in the Minime class of the French Championship. He won the championship in 2007 and continued his success by winning the Cadet class in 2008 ahead of Anthoine Hubert and Pierre Gasly. He then spent three years racing in the KF3 category and competed in the Spanish Championship and Italian Open Masters. He won the French KF3 title in 2010 and finished as runner-up in the WSK Euro Series in 2011 behind Max Verstappen.

At the age of 14, Ocon was signed by Gravity Sports management, a sister company of Renault F1 team.

2012–2013: Formula Renault 

In 2012, Ocon made his debut in single-seaters, taking part in the Eurocup Formula Renault 2.0 with Koiranen Motorsport. He finished fourteenth with four point-scoring finishes, including being on the podium at his home round at Circuit Paul Ricard. He also contested a partial campaign in the Formula Renault 2.0 Alps with Koiranen, finishing seventh with two podiums, both of which came at the Red Bull Ring.

He remained in the series for 2013, switching to the ART Junior Team. He recorded one pole position and won two races including at Circuit Paul Ricard, finishing the season in third place behind Pierre Gasly and Oliver Rowland. A partial campaign in the Northern European Cup produced a race win at the Hockenheimring and two further podiums.

2013–2015: Formula Three, GP3 and DTM

Ocon made his debut in Formula Three machinery at the 2013 Macau Grand Prix with Prema Powerteam. He stalled at the start of the main race but went on to finish tenth. He continued his collaboration with Prema into the 2014 FIA Formula 3 European Championship. He topped the standings at the first round at Silverstone Circuit and remained in the lead of the championship for the rest of the season. With two rounds to spare, he made a brief appearance in the 2014 Formula Renault 3.5 Series with Comtec Racing. Ocon was crowned FIA Formula 3 European champion with three races remaining, ahead of Tom Blomqvist and Max Verstappen. He finished on the podium in twenty-one of the thirty-three races, winning nine, and recorded fifteen pole positions. Ocon made a second appearance at the Macau Grand Prix in 2014. He qualified fourth for the main race but was eliminated by a multi-car collision on the first lap.

Ocon moved to the GP3 Series for 2015 with ART Grand Prix. Despite only scoring one race victory (two other victories were denied due to penalties), he won the championship by eight points ahead of Luca Ghiotto. Ocon recorded three pole positions and fourteen podium finishes (including nine consecutive second-places) from eighteen races.

Ocon drove for Mercedes-Benz in the first ten races of the 2016 DTM season, alongside his Formula One reserve driver role at Renault. He scored two points finishing ninth in the first race at Circuit Zandvoort, before he was promoted to a Formula 1 race seat. He was replaced by Felix Rosenqvist following his promotion.

Formula One career

Ocon's first experience of a Formula One car was on 22 October 2014, driving the Lotus E20 as part of a two-day test for Lotus F1. A month later, he made his Grand Prix weekend debut for Lotus during the first practice session at the Abu Dhabi Grand Prix.

In May 2015, Ocon was called up by Force India to drive at the post-race test in Barcelona, after Pascal Wehrlein was forced to withdraw due to illness. Prior to him claiming the GP3 title, it was announced that Ocon would enter the Mercedes Junior Team. In February 2016, it was announced that Ocon would also act as reserve driver for the Renault Sport F1 team for the  season. He took part in Friday practice sessions at four Grands Prix for the team.

Manor (2016)

On 10 August 2016, Rio Haryanto was dropped from the backmarker Manor Racing team after his sponsors had failed to meet their contractual obligations. Ocon was named as his replacement for the second half of the season, driving alongside Pascal Wehrlein. He earned his best result of twelfth in the rain-affected Brazilian Grand Prix, dropping out of the points positions on the final lap.

Force India (2017–2018)

2017

On 10 November 2016, Force India announced that they had signed Ocon for the  season as part of his multi-year contract with Mercedes, with Sergio Pérez as his new teammate.

Ocon later remarked that he was "furious" with Pérez and that he "risked [their] lives". Force India team owner Vijay Mallya stated that the repeated incidents were "very concerning" and that he would enforce team orders thereon.

He went on to finish the race sixth. He finished his first full season in Formula One eighth in the drivers' championship, scoring 87 points to Pérez's 100.

2018

After Force India's financial collapse and the purchasing of its assets by Canadian businessman Lawrence Stroll – father of Williams driver Lance Stroll – during the summer break, the new owners confirmed that Ocon and Pérez would remain with the team for the rest of the season. It was later revealed that Ocon had an "informal agreement" to join Renault for  before the team unexpectedly signed Daniel Ricciardo, leaving Ocon's future in doubt.

The team described the collision as "unacceptable" and banned the drivers from racing each other. Pérez later apologised for his role in the accident. Ocon was disqualified from eighth place at the  after his car was found to have exceeded fuel flow limits. Both drivers were able to continue racing and Ocon received a ten-second stop-and-go penalty for the incident. They argued just after the race (in which Verstappen finished second) and pushed each other several times. Both drivers were summoned by the FIA and Verstappen was ordered to undertake two days of public service "at the discretion of the FIA" for making deliberate physical contact with Ocon. 

Ocon finished the season twelfth in the drivers' championship, scoring 49 points to Pérez's 62.

Mercedes reserve driver (2019)
On 23 November 2018, it was announced that Ocon would join Mercedes as their reserve driver for  after it became clear that he would be replaced at Racing Point by team owner Lawrence Stroll’s son Lance – an outcome that was confirmed a week later. Ocon did not take part in a Grand Prix weekend during the year. He claimed to have been in discussions with Mercedes for the  season, remarking that he was "very close" to replacing Valtteri Bottas at the team. Mercedes ultimately decided to continue with Bottas.

Renault (2020)

Ocon joined Renault for 2020, signing a two-year contract and marking his return to Formula One as a full-time driver. He replaced Nico Hülkenberg and partnered with Daniel Ricciardo. Ocon qualified fourteenth on his Renault debut at the Austrian Grand Prix and finished eighth. He was running in seventh place at the  when he retired with a cooling issue. At the 70th Anniversary Grand Prix, he was issued a grid penalty after impeding George Russell in qualifying and started fourteenth, but improved to finish eighth in the race.

The team was unable to repair the damage during the red flag period which occurred soon after, and Ocon failed to make the restart. He experienced further mechanical retirements at the Eifel Grand Prix and the Emilia Romagna Grand Prix.

He had improved to fifth place by lap 54 of 87, assisted by collisions on the opening lap and drivers making second pit stops. A virtual safety car (VSC) period followed, which third-placed Carlos Sainz Jr. and fourth-placed Ricciardo attempted to take advantage of by entering the pits. However, the VSC period ended whilst they were in the pit lane, nullifying their advantage and promoting Ocon to third place. He was soon overtaken by Sergio Pérez, however pit stop issues for the leading Mercedes cars allowed Ocon to claim his first Formula One podium by finishing second, Renault's best race result since . He ended the season twelfth in the drivers' championship, scoring 62 points to Ricciardo's 119.

Alpine (2021–)

2021

Renault rebranded as Alpine F1 Team for the  season. The team signed two-time world champion Fernando Alonso to partner Ocon after Daniel Ricciardo left for McLaren. Ocon finished the race thirteenth and Vettel later apologised for the incident. Ocon was classified ninth at the  ahead of Alonso in tenth, earning the team their first points under the Alpine name. He struggled with tyre wear and finished fourteenth at the French Grand Prix, qualified seventeenth for both the Styrian and Austrian Grands Prix and retired from the latter after a first-lap collision with Antonio Giovinazzi.

Multiple collisions ahead saw him promoted to second place at the first corner, which became first place when race leader Lewis Hamilton pitted for dry-weather tyres one lap later than the rest of the field. Ocon held on to the lead for the remainder of the race, fending off Sebastian Vettel to take his and Alpine's maiden Formula One victory. This win was followed by points finishes at the next three races. The  took place in damp conditions and Ocon finished tenth having run the entire race distance on one set of intermediate-weather tyres. This was the first time a driver had completed a full race distance without making a pit stop since .

A collision with Antonio Giovinazzi at the  broke Ocon's front wing and ultimately led to retirement. Ocon ended the season eleventh in the drivers' championship, scoring 74 points to Alonso's 81.

2022

Alpine retained Ocon and Alonso for the  season. Ocon finished seventh at the season-opening  despite receiving a penalty for colliding with Mick Schumacher. He qualified fifth and finished sixth at the  where a close battle with Alonso ended with Ocon being ordered by the team to hold his position. A crash in practice for the  forced him to miss qualifying and start last on the grid. He recovered in the race to finish ninth and was promoted to eighth when Alonso received a penalty. At the Spanish Grand Prix, Ocon qualified twelfth and finished seventh, ahead of Alonso, after holding off the fast-charging Lando Norris. Ocon finished ninth at the  but was demoted to twelfth by a penalty for colliding with Lewis Hamilton.

At the British Grand Prix, Ocon qualified fifteenth due to battery issues and retired from the race with a fuel pump problem, despite the significant upgrade packages brought to the Alpine A522. Ocon qualified fifth at the  but was demoted to sixteenth by an engine component penalty. He recovered in the race to score points in seventh place. He started seventeenth at the  having experienced brake problems in qualifying and then retired from the race with an engine failure. Ocon was eliminated in the first qualifying session and started eighteenth at the United States Grand Prix; he finished eleventh after taking new power unit elements and starting from the pit lane. He was involved in separate collisions with teammate Alonso in the  sprint, with the damage to his car dropping him to seventeenth place. He recovered to score points in the race.

Ocon ended the season eighth in the drivers' championship, equalling his best result previously achieved in 2017. He scored 92 points to Alonso's 81.

2023
Ocon has signed a contract to remain with Alpine until the end of the 2024 season.

In the first race at Bahrain, he was penalized three times. First, he was given a five-second penalty for being out of the position on the grid. Second, he was handed a ten-second time penalty for failing to serve the penalty correctly, and he was awarded the third penalty after being caught speeding in the pit lane. Ocon eventually retired from the race on lap 43.

Karting record

Karting career summary

Racing record

Racing career summary 

 Season still in progress.

Complete Macau Grand Prix results

Complete Eurocup Formula Renault 2.0 results 
(key) (Races in bold indicate pole position) (Races in italics indicate fastest lap)

Complete FIA Formula 3 European Championship
(key) (Races in bold indicate pole position) (Races in italics indicate fastest lap)

Complete Formula Renault 3.5 Series results
(key) (Races in bold indicate pole position) (Races in italics indicate fastest lap)

Complete GP3 Series results
(key) (Races in bold indicate pole position) (Races in italics indicate fastest lap)

Complete Deutsche Tourenwagen Masters results
(key) (Races in bold indicate pole position) (Races in italics indicate fastest lap)

Complete Formula One results
(key) (Races in bold indicate pole position) (Races in italics indicates fastest lap)

 Half points awarded as less than 75% of race distance was completed.
 Season still in progress.

Formula One records
Ocon holds the following Formula One record:

References

External links

 
 

1996 births
Living people
Sportspeople from Évreux
French racing drivers
World Series Formula V8 3.5 drivers
Formula Renault 2.0 NEC drivers
Formula Renault Eurocup drivers
Formula Renault 2.0 Alps drivers
FIA Formula 3 European Championship drivers
French GP3 Series drivers
GP3 Series Champions
French Formula One drivers
Force India Formula One drivers
Manor Formula One drivers
Racing Point Force India Formula One drivers
Renault Formula One drivers
Alpine Formula One drivers
Formula One race winners
ART Grand Prix drivers
Prema Powerteam drivers
Comtec Racing drivers
Karting World Championship drivers
Koiranen GP drivers
R-ace GP drivers
French expatriate sportspeople in Switzerland
French people of Spanish descent